The Babuyan Islands, also known as the Babuyan Group of Islands, is an archipelago in the Philippines, located in the Luzon Strait north of the main island of Luzon and south of Taiwan via Bashi Channel to Luzon Strait. The archipelago consists of five major islands and their surrounding smaller islands. These main islands are, counterclockwise starting from northeast, Babuyan, Calayan, Dalupiri, Fuga, and Camiguin. The Babuyan Islands are separated from Luzon by the Babuyan Channel, and from the province of Batanes to the north by the Balintang Channel.

Geography
The largest of

Islands
The following are the islands of Babuyan and their adjoining islets and rocks, along with land areas and highest elevation:

Geology

The eastern islands of the archipelago are part of the Luzon Volcanic Arc.  Three volcanoes from two of the islands have erupted in historical times - Camiguin de Babuyanes on Camiguin Island, Babuyan Claro Volcano and Smith Volcano (also known as Mount Babuyan) on Babuyan Island.

Flora and fauna
All of the islands within the island group are classified by Haribon Foundation and BirdLife International as key biodiversity areas, or sites with outstanding universal value due to its geographic and biologic importance. All of the islands within the island group have never been part of any large landmass, and thus have unique flora and fauna, most of which are found nowhere else. A research conducted by the Department of Environment and Natural Resources have found at least 5 faunal regions in the area, one of the highest density of separate faunal regions in the world. The islands is also home to the most critically endangered bird species in the Philippines, the Calayan rail (found only on the small island of Calayan), and the most critically endangered snake species in the Philippines, the Ross' wolf snake (found only on the small island of Dalupiri). The island group is also a congregation site for endangered humpback whales, one of the only few of its kind in Southeast Asia. Due to its immense value to the natural world and Philippine biological diversity, various scientific and conservation groups have been lobbying for its declaration as a national park and its inclusion in the UNESCO World Heritage List.

Humpback whales have re-colonized into the area and the Babuyan became the only wintering ground for the species in the Philippines although historical records among Babuyan Islands have not been confirmed.

Demographics

List of islands by population (as of 2020):
 Calayan Island - 9,648 
 Camiguin Island - 5,231 
 Fuga Island - 1,939
 Babuyan Island - 1,910
 Dalupiri Island - 621
 Barit Island - 14

Government

The whole archipelago is administered under the province of Cagayan with Babuyan, Calayan, Camiguin, and Dalupiri comprising the municipality of Calayan while Fuga is under the jurisdiction of Aparri.

Babuyan and Dalupiri are themselves individual barangays in Calayan municipality, respectively named Babuyan Claro and Dalupiri, while Fuga Island is also an individual barangay, also named Fuga Island, in Aparri.

References

External links
Information on Fuga Island
Babuyan language wordlist at the Austronesian Basic Vocabulary Database

 
Islands of Cagayan
Archipelagoes of the Philippines
Archipelagoes of the Pacific Ocean